Arniston is a village in Midlothian, Scotland.

People from Arniston
The plant collector, David Bowman, was born in Arniston in 1838.

See also
Arniston House

References

External links

History of Parliament Online - Robert Dundas of Arniston

Villages in Midlothian